Paul Ariste (3 February 1905 – 2 February 1990) was an Estonian linguist renowned for his studies of the Finno-Ugric languages (especially Estonian and Votic), Yiddish and Baltic Romani language.

He was born as Paul Berg, in Rääbise, Võtikvere Parish (now Jõgeva Parish), Kreis Dorpat, Governorate of Livonia, Russian Empire, but in 1927 Estonized his name to Ariste. He graduated from the University of Tartu and subsequently worked with it. Ariste wrote his M.A. thesis ("Eesti-rootsi laensõnad eesti keeles") on Swedish – viz. Estonian Swedish dialect – loanwords in Estonian, his doctoral thesis ("Hiiu murrete häälikud") treated the Hiiumaa dialect of Estonian language. From 1945 to 1946, Ariste was imprisoned by the Soviet authorities (for having been member of Veljesto, a student association in independent Estonia)

Since 1927 Paul Ariste eagerly participated in activities of Estonian Folklore Archives, where he established collections of Jewish, Swedish and Romani folklore, and contributed a lot to collections of Finno-Baltic minorities and Old-Believers of Peipsi region.

He was the head of the Finno-Ugrian Department at the University of Tartu and one of the two most instrumental personalities in reviving Soviet Finno-Ugrian studies. Ariste founded the journal Sovetskoye finnougrovedeniye (Советское финноугроведение; Soviet Finno-Ugric Studies, later renamed Linguistica Uralica).

He was also a notable Esperantist, and a member of the Academy of Esperanto between 1967 and 1976. He was also listed in a year 2000 issue of the Esperanto magazine La Ondo among the 100 most eminent Esperantists.

He died in Tartu, aged 84.

Notable students
Lydia Vasikova, philologist

References

Further reading
 Ariste, Paul (1939). A quantitative language. Proceedings of the 3rd International Congress of Phonetic Sciences. Ghent. P. 276–280.
 Ariste, Paul (1953). Eesti keele foneetika [Phonetics of Estonian]. Tallinn: Eesti Riiklik Kirjastus.
 Ariste, Paul (1960). Vadjalaste laule. Tallinn.
 Ariste, Paul (1968). A Grammar of the Votic Language. Bloomington: Indiana University. 
 Ariste, Paul (1981). Keelekontaktid: Eesti keele kontakte teiste keeltega [Language contacts: Contacts of Estonian with other languages]. Tallinn: Valgus.
 Viitso, Tiit-Rein (2005). Paul Ariste 100. Linguistica Uralica No 1/2005, 1–3. 
 Viitso, Tiit-Rein (2005). Some Comments about Paul Ariste's Doctoral Dissertation on Phonetics of Hiiumaa Estonian Dialects. Linguistica Uralica No 1/2005, 4-19.

Yiddish studies
"Kalevipoja" juudikeelne tõlge (1926).Eesti kirjandus 4. Lk. 224–229.
 Etlexe jidiše folkslider in dem lider-repertuar fun di estn (1932). JIVO bleter 3, Z.148-157.
 Juut eesti rahvausus (1932). Eesti Kirjandus 1, Lk. 1-17; 3, Lk. 132–150; 5, Lk. 219–228. 
 Juudi keel (1933). Kevadik 6, Lk. 74–76.
 Cu der hašpoe fun jidish ojf nit-idiše špraxn (1937). JIVO bleter 11, Z. 83–85. 
 Ch. Lemchenas. Lietuvių kalbos įtaka Lietuvos žydų tarmei (1970). Baltistika. 6 (2), Psl. 250–252. [Review.]

External links 
 Onga, Mare. Professor Paul Ariste biobibliograafia 1921-2000 = Professor Paul Ariste : Biobibliographie 1921-2000
 Linguistica Uralica
 Paul Ariste Centre for Indigenous Finno-Ugric Peoples
 Paul Ariste and the Veps Folklore by Kristi Salve

1905 births
1990 deaths
People from Jõgeva Parish
People from Kreis Dorpat
Linguists from Estonia
Linguists of Romani
Estonian Esperantists
Estonian Finno-Ugrists
Linguists from the Soviet Union
University of Tartu alumni
Academic staff of the University of Tartu
Members of the Estonian Academy of Sciences
Estonian prisoners and detainees
Soviet prisoners and detainees
Recipients of the Order of Lenin
Recipients of the Order of the Red Banner of Labour
Recipients of the Order of Friendship of Peoples
Burials at Raadi cemetery
Soviet academics